Agonidium longeantennatum is a species of ground beetle in the subfamily Platyninae. It was described by Burgeon in 1942.

References

longeantennatum
Beetles described in 1942